Abbotabad Cantonment is a cantonment adjacent to Abbotabad in Khyber Pakhtunkhwa, Pakistan. The Pakistan Military Academy is located at Kakul, which is adjacent to the Abbotabad Cantonment. 

It has an area of 6936.21 acres, which is governed by Cantonment Board of Abbottabad.

History
During the development of area, different species of trees and flowers were used, including ash, chinars, elm, fragrant camphor, Himalayan and Lebanese cedars, magnificent horse chestnut trees, pines, and mahogany.

It has been noticed that the cantonment board is slowly demolishing British-era buildings and structures including demolition of Major Abbott Office.

References

Cantonments of Pakistan